Romeo Izziyh Doubs (born April 13, 2000) is an American football wide receiver for the Green Bay Packers of the National Football League (NFL). He played college football at Nevada and was selected by the Packers in the fourth round of the 2022 NFL Draft.

High school career
Doubs attended Jefferson High School in Los Angeles. He played quarterback and running back as well as wide receiver in high school. As a senior Doubs rushed for 1,757 yards and 28 touchdowns and he caught 13 passes for 354 yards and five touchdowns. He was listed as a three-star recruit by 247Sports.com and a two-star recruit by Rivals.com. He committed to the University of Nevada, Reno.

College career
As a true freshman in 2018, Doubs had 43 pass receptions for 562 yards and two touchdowns. He also returned a punt 80 yards for a touchdown, in his first game vs Portland State. In Doubs' sophomore season, he would play in ten games tallying 649 yards on 44 receptions for four touchdowns. After his performance he was named Nevada's team MVP. As a junior, Doubs would have a 1,000-yard season where he would also have nine touchdowns. He was named to the First team All-Mountain West after leading the conference in receiving yards. In Doubs' senior year, he would have a career best of 80 receptions, for 1109 yards, and eleven touchdowns. He was once again named to the First team All-Mountain West. In a game vs Fresno State, Doubs caught 19 passes tying the school record for most receptions in a game and being the most receptions in a game in the FBS that season. Doubs would forgo playing in the 2021 Quick Lane Bowl and declared for the 2022 NFL Draft. He played 43 games during his college career, recording 225 receptions for 3,322 yards and 26 touchdowns.

Professional career

Doubs was drafted by the Green Bay Packers in the fourth round (132nd overall) of the 2022 NFL Draft. He signed his four-year rookie contract on May 26, 2022.

2022 

Throughout his rookie training camp, Doubs reportedly impressed both teammates and coaches. On August 12, 2022, he scored the first Packers touchdown of the preseason on a 29-yard pass from fellow Mountain West Conference alum Jordan Love.  The following week Doubs would catch another touchdown pass, adding to his preseason total.

Doubs saw his first NFL action on September 11, 2022, in a Week 1 loss against the Minnesota Vikings, finishing with four catches for 37 yards. He had a breakout performance on September 25 during a Week 3 victory over the Tampa Bay Buccaneers, catching all eight of his targets for 73 yards and his first NFL touchdown, a five-yard reception from Aaron Rodgers. Doubs was named the Pepsi NFL Rookie of the Week for his play. The following week Doubs caught Rodgers' 500th career touchdown pass. He was also part of a controversial non-catch on a potential go-ahead touchdown pass from Rodgers. On November 6, Doubs injured his ankle on the first play of the game. Doubs would miss four games, before returning on December 19. In his first game back, he led the team in receiving yards totaling five catches for 55 yards in a victory over the Los Angeles Rams.

Doubs finished his rookie year with 42 receptions for 425 yards and three receiving touchdowns.

NFL career statistics

Regular season

References

External links
Green Bay Packers bio
Nevada Wolf Pack bio

2000 births
Nevada Wolf Pack football players
Players of American football from Los Angeles
Living people
Jefferson High School (Los Angeles) alumni
American football wide receivers
Green Bay Packers players